Mark Allen Klaassen (born April 17, 1973) is an American attorney who served as the United States Attorney in the United States District Court for the District of Wyoming from 2017 to 2021.

Klaassen was raised in Gillette, Wyoming. A graduate of Oral Roberts University and Notre Dame Law School, he clerked for Wade Brorby of the United States Court of Appeals for the Tenth Circuit. Klaassen began his career as an associate at Latham & Watkins. From 2007 to 2009, Klaassen was chief of staff to the general counsel for the United States Department of Homeland Security, and he also served as general counsel for the United States House Committee on Homeland Security from 2003 to 2007.  He was formerly an Assistant United States Attorney for the same district prior to his elevation to his current post.

United States Attorney for the District of Wyoming
On August 3, 2017, Donald Trump nominated Klaassen to be United States Attorney for the District of Wyoming. He was confirmed by the United States Senate by voice vote on November 9, 2017, and sworn into office on November 21, 2017. He resigned on January 31, 2021.

References

External links
 Biography at U.S. Department of Justice

1973 births
Living people
Assistant United States Attorneys
Notre Dame Law School alumni
Oral Roberts University alumni
People from Gillette, Wyoming
United States Attorneys for the District of Wyoming
Wyoming lawyers
21st-century American lawyers